Stacey "Stay Lo" Reile (born November 30, 1973) is a world
champion female boxer who won the first female IBF featherweight world championship. Reile was born in Utica, New York and lived there during her childhood. Reile later moved to South Florida and currently resides in Miami Beach, Florida. Reile has worked with world-renowned trainers throughout her career such as Eric Castanos, Orlando Cuellar, Jorge Rubio, John David Jackson, and Carlos Gamboa. Reile's pro fights can be viewed on YouTube as well as sparring, training, and her two appearances on the reality television show Miami Ink. Reile is primarily self-employed as Fitness manager, Nationally certified personal trainer & Celebrity massage therapist. Which is how she supported her boxing career without a manager or promoter. Some of her clients have been celebrities such as Anderson Silva, Hulk Hogan, Roy Jones Junior, Floyd Mayweather Calvin Klein, Queen Latifah, Tiny, from "TI & Tiny" Russell Simmons, and Al Roker. Reile has also done modeling and was photographed and interviewed for the September 2009 issue of Nine5Four Magazine. Reile's usual nickname is "Stay Lo" derived from her fighting style, middle name Louise and uncanny resemblance to actress J-Lo.

Amateur boxing

Upon moving to South Florida, Reile developed her fitness and won second place at the Miss Fitness South Florida competition in 1999. She also began training for boxing in the late 1990s under the tutelage of trainer Luis Lagerman and Women's International Boxing Association (WIBA) President, Ryan Wissow. Reile had only two scheduled amateur matches. The first was to take place in the 126 pound division at the Florida State Golden Gloves tournament in 2000. Reile's opponent did not show up, so Reile won by a walkover. Reile also won her second amateur bout by defeating Vanessa Ramos. Although this was Reile's last fight as an amateur, Reile decided to delay becoming a pro boxer and instead honed her craft in the gym for the next four years. Just a few days before her pro debut in 2004, Reile traveled to American Top Team in Coconut Creek, Florida, to spar with Shelby Walker. At the time of the sparring session, Walker was a veteran of 11 pro boxing fights and challenged for a world featherweight title about two months before.

Professional career

Early Fights
Reile made her professional debut against Myriam Bazile in Boynton Beach, Florida, on July 24, 2004. Reile won by TKO. The referee waved off the bout at 1:07 of the second round when Bazile stopped throwing punches and was just trying to block the punches from Reile.

Reile participated in two unsanctioned bouts in Tokyo, Japan. The first was on March 13, 2005, against Riyo Togo in which Reile won by a four-round unanimous decision. Togo suffered her first loss as a pro in this bout. After this fight, Reile made an appearance on The Learning Channel's Miami Ink, a reality television show about a tattoo shop in Miami Beach. Reile decided to get angel wing tattoos on her hips and became known as "The Fighting Angel." For her second unsanctioned bout, Reile returned to Tokyo to face MMA fighter–boxer Ariya. Reile won by a four-round unanimous decision on October 1, 2005.

Reile won by knockout at 37 seconds of the first round against Yessenia de Jesus on February 10, 2006, in Coral Gables, Florida. Reile landed a left hook to the head of de Jesus which knocked her out. On April 21, 2006, Reile faced national amateur champion Nora Reyes of Chicago in Reyes' home state of Illinois. Reile won by majority decision.

Reile then faced Lakeysha "The Total Package" Williams on June 29, 2006 in Miami, Florida. Williams had gone the distance against world class boxers such as Elena Reid, Ada Velez, Jeri Sitzes, and Kelsey Jeffries prior to her bout against Reile. Reile won by TKO when referee Jorge Alonso stepped in between the two boxers and waved off the fight just before the bell rang to end the round. The official time of stoppage was 2:59 of the third round.

Reile won by a six-round unanimous decision against WIBA FedeLatina super bantamweight champion Delia Hoppe of the Dominican Republic on December 14, 2006, in Hallandale, Florida.  Reile faced another opponent from the Dominican Republic in her next bout against Maribel Santana who had challenged for world titles three times before. Reile defeated Santana by a six-round unanimous decision on January 23, 2008. The fight took place in Reile's home city of Miami Beach, Florida.

Title Fights and Notable Fights
Reile fought for the world featherweight championship against WBC and WIBF featherweight champion Ina Menzer of Germany on May 31, 2008. The fight was in Germany. After campaigning as a super bantamweight for most of her career, Reile moved to the featherweight division for her bout against Menzer. Menzer hit Reile on her left ear after the bell rang to end the third round. This ruptured Reile's eardrum and affected her equilibrium. With Reile's equilibrium off, Menzer was able to knock Reile down in the fourth round. Reile immediately got up, but her trainer unexpectedly waved his arms which forced the referee to stop the fight. Therefore, the bout was officially ruled a win for Menzer by TKO even though Reile was standing at the time of stoppage which was 1:39 of the fourth round.

Reile fought in the home state of another undefeated opponent when she faced Crystal "Choo Choo" Delgado of Houston, Texas, on March 26, 2009. The fight occurred in Humble, Texas, which is near Houston. The bout was fought at a catch weight of 128 pounds, which is in the middle of the featherweight limit of 126 pounds and the super featherweight limit of 130 pounds. Delgado rose before the count of ten, but the referee decided that Delgado could not continue and waved off the fight. The time of stoppage was 23 seconds of the sixth round and Reile won by TKO. After this fight, Reile wanted a rematch against Menzer. Reile was the No. 1 ranked contender by the WIBF, but was never awarded another title shot against Menzer.

Reile lost to Ada Velez by unanimous decision on February 27, 2010 in Miami, Florida. Velez was one of the top pound for pound female boxers in the world when this fight took place. This fight was in the super bantamweight division.

Reile lost to Elina Tissen of Germany by a controversial unanimous decision on October 9, 2010 for the Global Boxing Union featherweight title. The fight was in Tissen's home country of Germany.

Reile won the vacant International Boxing Federation (IBF) female featherweight championship on March 31, 2011 against Dahiana Santana of the Dominican Republic by a controversial split decision. The fight took place in San Jose, Costa Rica.

The IBF ordered an immediate rematch.  Dahiana Santana won the IBF female featherweight title by unanimous decision and defeated Reile in her first title defense on November 20, 2011. The fight took place in Las Vegas, Nevada.  This was the final fight of Reile's pro career.

Professional boxing record

References

SEE!! She IS 46 years old!!

American women boxers
Living people
Sportspeople from Utica, New York
1973 births
Featherweight boxers
21st-century American women